USS Wahneta has been the name of more than United States Navy ship, and may refer to:

 , a yard tug in commission from 1893 to 1920
 , later YTM-134, a yard tug in commission from 1939 to 1946

See also
 

United States Navy ship names